Orosházi Férfi Kézilabda Sportegyesület  is a Hungarian handball club from Orosháza, that plays in the  Nemzeti Bajnokság I, the top level championship in Hungary.

The current name of the club is Orosháza FKSE-Linamar due to sponsorship reasons.

Crest, colours, supporters

Naming history

Kit manufacturers and Shirt sponsor
The following table shows in detail Orosházi FKSE kit manufacturers and shirt sponsors by year:

Kits

Sports Hall information
Name: – Eötvös Sportcsarnok
City: – Orosháza
Capacity: – 740
Address: – 5900 Orosháza, Eötvös tér 2.

Management

Current squad
Squad for the 2021–22 season

Transfers
Transfers for the 2021–22 season

Joining 

  Szabolcs Antal (LP) from  Dabas KK
  Dániel Takó (RB) from  PLER KC
  Roland Kiss (CB) from  Ceglédi KKSE
  Bence Kovács (LB) from  Mezőkövesdi KC
  Sándor Molnár (RW) from  Köröstarcsai KSK
  László Pajkó (GK) from  Békési FKC
  Zsolt Mihály (LB) from  Szejke SK

Leaving 

  Alialsei Ushal (LP) to  Grundfos Tatabánya KC
  Yunus Özmusul (GK) to  Spor Toto SK
  Aldin Sakic
  Ottó Kancel
  Alexey Peskov
  Ákos Lele (LB) to  Békési FKC

Previous Squads

Top Scorers

Honours

Recent seasons

Seasons in Nemzeti Bajnokság I: 12
Seasons in Nemzeti Bajnokság I/B: 9
Seasons in Nemzeti Bajnokság II: 1

In European competition
Orosháza score listed first. As of 25 November 2018.

Participations in EHF Cup: 2x

EHF Ranking

Former club members

Notable former players

 József Ambrus
 Sándor Bajusz
 Mohamed Yassine Benmiloud
 Dániel Buday
 József Czina
 Botond Ferenczi
 Tamás Frey
 Péter Gúnya
 Norbert Gyene 
 Ákos Balda
Julien Lopez Humberto
 Marinko Kekezović
 Attila Komporály
 Ákos Lele
 Gergő Lókodi
 László Németh
 Gábor Oláh
 Ádám Országh
 István Rosta
 János Stranigg
 Norbert Sutka
 Levente Szabó
 Milán Varsandán
 Norbert Visy
 Szabolcs Zubai
 Ivan Milas
 Aldin Sakic 
 Gradimir Sančanin
 Emir Suhonjić
 Aliaksei Ushal
 Felipe Roberto Braz
 Dominik Smojver
 Domagoj Srsen
 Khaled Essam
 Teimuraz Orjonikidze
 Niv Levy
 Pavel Macovchin
 Nikola Markoski
 Alexey Peskov
 Ottó Kancel
 Matus Mino
 Matevž Čemas
 Igor Žabić (2016)
 Goran Đukić
 Tibor Ivanišević
 Marko Knežević
 Dušan Marić
 Milan Mažić
 David Miloradović
 Igor Milović
 Igor Mrsulja
 Zoran Radojević
 Savo Slavuljica
 Yunus Özmusul
 Yevhen Buinenko

Former coaches

References

External links
 Official website  

Hungarian handball clubs
Békés County